, also known as , is a fictional character in the One Piece franchise created by Eiichiro Oda.

In the story, Zoro is the first crewmate to join Monkey D. Luffy's crew after he is saved (by Luffy and Koby) from being executed at the Marine Base by Captain Morgan. He is the crew's combatant, and one of the two swordsmen of the Straw Hat Pirates, the other being Brook. He also has an extremely poor sense of direction, which is a running gag throughout the whole series, he's the son of Roronoa Arashi and Tera and is the grandson of Shimotsuki Furiko and Roronoa Pinzoro.

Creation and conception 

Zoro originally used two swords instead of three. Zoro was originally planned to be part of Buggy the Clown’s pirate crew and would have been recruited by Luffy away from Buggy. Zoro's surname was based on the Japanese pronunciation of French pirate François l'Olonnais. In several Western localizations, his name was changed to Zolo.

Design 
Zoro commonly wears a plain white shirt (though he can be seen wearing other types of shirts), black pants, and a light-green, haramaki sash that holds his three swords. These sword's names are Enma, Wado Ichimonji, and Sandai Kitetsu. Zoro also has a black bandanna tied around his left biceps that he only wears on his head while in a serious battle. Under his shirt, his torso is heavily scarred from many of the battles he has fought, especially since he joined the Straw Hats (like the one acquired during the battle against Dracule Mihawk, one of the Seven Warlords of the Sea). He has three golden earrings in his left ear, which denotes his three swords style. After the two year time-skip, Zoro has a scar across his left eye (obtained during his training under Dracule Mihawk) and replaces his shirt with a long dark green samurai's coat which he can even open the torso while fighting (against the New Fishman Pirates) or when he experiences heat (burning side of Punk Hazard). Concerning his ethnic appearance, Oda revealed that he imagines Zoro to be of Japanese descent, albeit in a real-world context.

Zoro has many scars on his body. The most noticeable is the long scar running down his left eye, which is the one he got after returning from the two-year time skip. It is currently unknown how he acquired it, but he either can't or won't open his left eye because of it. 
He also has a heavily scarred torso, having a diagonal cut mark from the top left to the bottom right of his torso due to fighting Dracule Mihawk. He also has scars on both of his ankles, which he obtained from trying to cut his own legs off to escape the candle prison of Mr. 3 in Little Garden.

Voice actors 

In the original Japanese version of the One Piece anime series, Zoro is voiced by Kazuya Nakai as an adult and Megumi Urawa as a child. In the first OVA Defeat Him! The Pirate Ganzack from 1998 is voiced by Wataru Takagi.

In Odex's dubs of the first 104 episodes of One Piece in Singapore, Zoro was voiced by Brian Zimmerman. In the 4kids Entertainment's dub of the first 104 episodes of One Piece, Zoro was renamed "Zolo," which was later influenced and implemented in the Viz Media adaption of the manga series; he was voiced by Marc Diraison. In Funimation Entertainment's dubs of the entire One Piece franchise, adult Zoro is voiced by Christopher Sabat with Cynthia Cranz playing the role of child Zoro for episode 2 and by Brina Palencia for the rest of the franchise. Sabat compared Zoro's characterization with Tsubasa: Reservoir Chronicles Kurogane and YuYu Hakushos Kazuma Kuwabara, describing them as "the tough guy with a heart of gold". As a result, Sabat feared that he sometimes performs similar voices despite the fact the characters are different. He also tried seeing the original actors' works to avoid getting a more specific delivery. In the game One Piece: Unlimited Adventure, Sabat reprises his role as adult Zoro, with child Zoro voiced by Aaron Dismuke.

Characteristics 
Zoro is confident but often acts in a very comical manner. A running gag is that he has a terrible sense of direction (being capable of getting lost even while walking in a straight line) which he is very insecure about since he never admits when he gets lost, instead always blaming someone else. While the crew is out at sea, Zoro can (usually) be found sleeping or training towards his goal of becoming the world's best swordsman. He and Sanji have a great rivalry, often resorting to fighting (both verbally and physically) over issues from minor to extreme. Zoro had never called Sanji by his name in the original Japanese manga, he uses phrases like "dumb-cook", etc. On the other side, Sanji uses phrases like marimo (moss-head). etc.

Though not a samurai, he appears to maintain a certain degree of bushido and is frequently mistaken for one. Unlike Luffy and most of the other Straw Hat Pirates, Zoro has been known to kill his opponents if he has to, though never in cold blood. It is shown that Zoro enjoys fighting a strong opponent (usually left to face down the second strongest villain in each arc, as Luffy faces down the strongest). Zoro tends to retain a maniacal grin and serious glare when battling a worthy opponent.

Personality
Zoro has a stern, serious, and distanced personality, but unlike Robin, he often reacts in a goofy and exaggerated comic style due to his short-tempered and impatient attitude. On the ship, he normally either trains with weights or sleeps. The only work he is seen doing regularly is hoisting the anchor using his great strength and maintaining a lookout in the ship's crow's nest (which on the Thousand Sunny ship also doubles as his personal gym). He also likes sake, almost to the degree that Luffy likes meat, but like Nami, he never gets drunk due to his inhumanly-high endurance and tolerance for alcohol. Another notable trait is his lack of orientation, as Zoro often gets lost, even in small, familiar spaces or when being led by someone. Despite this, he is often the first to sense an enemy or danger and the first to react. He is often displayed as being well aware of dangerous situations and the people around him.

Zoro often reminds others of the harsh facts, which shocks some of the other crew members, although they usually decide he is right. Zoro is an atheist because he stated that he does not pray to any god, could not care one way or the other, and has never believed in anything except himself. Even so, Zoro knows that he still has much-untapped potential and is constantly seen training and improving his fighting skills. He also adheres to a strict sword master's code of honor and never falsely brags or lies about his abilities, sometimes outright admitting a weakness, even to an enemy. He also never tries to escape from a fight or use trickery to win, believing that doing so is cowardly and scorning anyone who uses such tactics. Zoro is vigorous, strong-willed, and determined.

Haki
He is proficient in both Armament and Observation Haki, as well as one of the few known characters who possess Conquerors Haki. During his battle against King, Zoro unlocks an advanced form of Conquerors Haki, which gave him the ability to coat his swords with it, similar to Armament Haki, which could further enhance his attacks. He also uses an advanced form of Armament Haki to shoot a short blast of Haki from a distance.

Appearances

One Piece manga
Roronoa Zoro first appears in the manga chapter , first published in Japan's Weekly Shōnen Jump magazine on August 18, 1997, and first appeared in 1st Episode of anime. He first appears as a captured criminal awaiting his execution at the hands of the Marines. Before the beginning of the series' narrative, Zoro loses his childhood friend Kuina and vows to become the strongest swordsman in the world. For years, Zoro hunts pirates as a bounty hunter only to get money for food in the company of his friends Johnny and Yosaku. Zoro initially did this because he got lost seeking to face the best swordsman in the world, Dracule Mihawk. When Luffy offers Zoro the opportunity to join his crew, Zoro initially refuses. But after Luffy saves him from execution, Zoro pledges loyalty to him. Zoro is later easily defeated at Mihawk's hands at the Baratie restaurant and pledges to Luffy that he would never lose again.

Zoro's loyalty to Luffy is incomparable among the crew and develops through the series. Even though he joined Luffy's crew, his main goal was to become the strongest swordsman. Originally Zoro threatened to kill Luffy if he ever got in the way of this goal. He listens to his captain's order and follows the order until the very end. On Jaya, Zoro followed Luffy's orders not to fight an enemy in a bar no matter what and followed it without hesitation. In "Water 7," Zoro upholds the authority of Luffy as captain during Luffy's fight with Usopp and Usopp's leaving of the crew. Zoro pointedly refuses to allow Usopp to rejoin the crew without an apology and threatens to be the next to leave because to let Usopp "back as if nothing happened was an insult to Luffy's authority as captain. He even slapped Luffy with the reality that being a pirate isn't a game."

On the next island, Thriller Bark, Bartholomew Kuma confronted a knocked-out Luffy and the Straw Hats and asked the protagonists to surrender Luffy. Everyone refused, and Kuma knocked everyone out except for Zoro, Sanji, and Brook. Zoro offers to sacrifice his life for Luffy, proclaiming that Luffy will be the man to become Pirate King. Sanji also offers his life, but Zoro knocks out Sanji to save his life. Zoro begs Kuma not to take Luffy and to take him instead. Zoro told Kuma that he is even willing to give up his dream of becoming the world's greatest swordsman for Luffy's dream. After seeing this, Kuma agreed to Zoro instead of taking Zoro with him. Kuma asked to take all Luffy's pain after fighting Gecko Moria. Zoro's dream in the entire series was to become the world's greatest swordsman, but he is willing to give that up for Luffy, showing how loyal Zoro grew to his captain after initially threatening to end Luffy's life for threatening his dream.

After fighting Daz Bonez in Alabasta, Zoro's bounty is initially set at 60,000,000 but is later raised to 120,000,000 after fighting the World Government at Enies Lobby. Later, the crew is separated by Bartholomew Kuma, which resulted in pre and post-time skips. Zoro encounters Mihawk again and trains under him for two years before reuniting with the crew. He receives a bounty of 320,000,000 after cutting up an antagonist as large as a mountain and assisting Luffy at the end of Don Quixote Doflamingo's tyrannical rule. After the events in Wano Country and his contributions in the Onigashima Raid such as defeating King, he receives a bounty of 1,111,000,000.

In One Piece volume 105, Oda revealed Zoro's family history. His father, Roronoa Arashi, was killed by pirates and his mother, Tera, died of illness when he was young. Zoro is a descendant of the Shimotsuki family of Wano Country through his grandmother Furiko, the older sister of Ushimaru, the daimyo of Ringo who is Zoro's great-uncle. Zoro is related to Kuina as distant cousins and is the ancestor of Shimotsuki Ryuma.

In other media
Zoro has made several appearances in other media, including, but not limited to, every One Piece licensed electronic video game to date, including Jump Super Stars and Jump Ultimate Stars. In 2006, he is featured in the Dragon Ball/One Piece/Naruto crossover game Battle Stadium D.O.N..

Zoro appears in a special episode of One Piece X Toriko, fighting Zebra and Vegeta, Zoro appears lost, searching for his crew, until Zebra appears to Zoro, and Vegeta appears searching for Goku to "settle the score", the three were furious and fought without end.

Zoro will be portrayed by Mackenyu in Netflix's live action adaptation of One Piece.

Reception
Zoro is always among the top three most popular characters, usually only below Luffy in popularity. He ranked second in every Shōnen Jump character popularity poll except the fifth, where he ranked third after Trafalgar Law. Furthermore, in a 2007 poll by Oricon, Zoro was voted as the 4th most desired character to receive a spinoff. DVD Talk praises Zoro's "hilarious" three-sword fighting style as a great example of the show's sense of humor. Holly Ellingwood from Activeanime praised Zoro's fight against Luffy as one of the best moments from the 10th DVD from the series released by Viz Media, praising the action scenes. Sabat's work with Zoro has resulted in him being nominated in the category "Best Voice Actor (English)" in the Society for the Promotion of Japanese Animation (SPJA) Awards from 2008. Carl Kimlinger of Anime News Network commented on Sabat's work with Zoro as a "standout", noting that Zoro and Sabat are "well-matched. Kimlinger also found that his and Sanji's flashbacks from the anime "really do jerk tears, even if they are less than gracefully executed".

When Nico Robin refers to the two as the "Wings of the Pirate King," it "suggests that they're the two most important people to Luffy becoming the Pirate King, for their ability to carry their responsibility effectively and fight at the highest level, if not more."

References

External links 

 Roronoa Zoro's bio at One Pieces official website

Further reading

One Piece characters
Anime and manga characters who can move at superhuman speeds
Anime and manga characters with superhuman strength
Martial artist characters in anime and manga
Comics characters introduced in 1997
Fictional bounty hunters
Fictional characters missing an eye
Fictional characters with disfigurements
Orphan characters in anime and manga
Fictional sea pirates
Fictional kenjutsuka
Fictional swordfighters in anime and manga
Male characters in anime and manga
Teenage characters in anime and manga
Vigilante characters in comics
ca:Llista de personatges de One Piece#Roronoa Zoro